The 1996–97 Buffalo Sabres season was the 27th for the National Hockey League franchise that was established on May 22, 1970. The season was the first season in the newly constructed Marine Midland Arena. The Sabres also underwent a drastic uniform change, replacing the blue and gold colors and classic crest with a black and red color scheme and new white buffalo-head logo. The Sabres won their first Northeast Division title, their first division title in 16 years.

Off-season

Regular season
On January 12, 1997, Jason Dawe scored just ten seconds into the overtime period to give the Sabres a 3–2 road win over the Phoenix Coyotes. It would prove to be the fastest overtime goal scored during the 1996–97 NHL regular season.

The Sabres allowed the fewest shorthanded goals (4) and scored the most shorthanded goals (16) in the NHL. The Sabres' power play struggled, as they finished 26th in power-play percentage, with 13.19% (43 for 326). The Sabres were also shut out a league-high 10 times during the regular season.

Season standings

Schedule and results

Playoffs
1997 Stanley Cup playoffs
The Sabres defeated the Ottawa Senators in the first round. The series was played to overtime in Game 7. Derek Plante scored the series clinching goal in overtime. The Sabres then lost to the Philadelphia Flyers in five games in the second round.

Player statistics

Regular season
Scoring

Goaltending

Playoffs
Scoring

Goaltending

Note: Pos = Position; GP = Games played; G = Goals; A = Assists; Pts = Points; +/- = plus/minus; PIM = Penalty minutes; PPG = Power-play goals; SHG = Short-handed goals; GWG = Game-winning goals
      MIN = Minutes played; W = Wins; L = Losses; T = Ties; GA = Goals-against; GAA = Goals-against average; SO = Shutouts; SA = Shots against; SV = Shots saved; SV% = Save percentage;

Awards and records
 Dominik Hasek, Hart Memorial Trophy
 Dominik Hasek, Lester B. Pearson Award
 Dominik Hasek, Vezina Trophy
 Dominik Hasek, NHL First Team All-Star
 Seymour Knox, Lester Patrick Trophy
 Pat Lafontaine, Lester Patrick Trophy
 Michael Peca, Frank J. Selke Trophy
NHL All-Star Game
 Dominik Hasek, Eastern Conference

Draft picks
Buffalo's draft picks at the 1996 NHL Entry Draft held at the Kiel Center in St. Louis, Missouri.

References
 Sabres on Hockey Database

1996-97 Buffalo Sabres season
B
B
Buffalo
Buffalo